Yellow Boots is a 1954 novel by Canadian-Ukrainian author Vera Lysenko. The novel is considered the first English language novel written by a Canadian of Ukrainian descent.

References

1954 Canadian novels